Efraín Cortés Gruesso (born July 10, 1984), known as Efraín Cortés, is a Colombian football centre back.

Notes

External links
 
 

1984 births
Living people
Colombian footballers
Colombian expatriate footballers
Deportes Quindío footballers
Millonarios F.C. players
Deportivo Cali footballers
Querétaro F.C. footballers
Club Nacional de Football players
C.F. Pachuca players
Club Puebla players
Atlético Huila footballers
América de Cali footballers
Patriotas Boyacá footballers
Boyacá Chicó F.C. footballers
Categoría Primera A players
Categoría Primera B players
Liga MX players
Colombian expatriate sportspeople in Mexico
Colombian expatriate sportspeople in Uruguay
Expatriate footballers in Mexico
Expatriate footballers in Uruguay
Association football defenders
Sportspeople from Valle del Cauca Department